is a Japanese light novel series written by Noritake Tao and illustrated by Booota. The series was published by Shogakukan under their Gagaga Bunko imprint between August 18, 2015 and September 19, 2018 with eight compiled volumes. An anime television series adaptation by Lerche aired from July to September 2018.

Plot
In 2034, in the globally popular MMORPG Union, there was once a top group of legends named Subaru, made of six elementary school friends. However, once one of their members died of a heart attack presumably brought on from dying in the game, Union shut down the game. Six years later, a new game called Re'Union is launched, with similar mechanics, and when Haruto, one of Subaru's original members, meets Asahi, his partner who died six years before, the members of Subaru gather once again to uncover the mystery behind it.

Characters

Haruto is a Fighter and was the leader of guild Subaru. An optimist during his childhood, he has lived a hollow life after Asahi's death six years ago.

Asahi is a rear guard member of Subaru who is always seen with smile on her face. She died from heart failure right after her in-game character dies, leading to the closure of Union.

Satsuki is a mage of Subaru who has feelings for Haruto and often tries to convey them to him but her attempts go unnoticed. She is good friend's with Asahi but was jealous of her close association with Haruto. In episode 9, she confesses her affections for him and tells him to come up with a decision by the time for a dance. Haruto appeared and apologized as she realized he has chosen Asahi and isn't too surprised.

The sub leader of Subaru who has feelings for Asahi. While Takanori is intelligent, like Haruto he was oblivious to the affections of his friend Nozomi and was shocked that he never noticed her behavior. 

The only foreign member of Subaru.

A shy and introverted girl of Subaru who has feelings for Takanori. When Satsuki and Haruto find her, they caught up and she was informed Asahi was alive in the game but didn't believe it and refused to play the game since she stopped doing so. She later played and found Takanori dancing with Satsuki and believed they were now a couple, which devastated her to the point where she joined evil mages. Nozomi became so unhinged and disturbed that she cursed Asahi after seeing she was alive. In episode 11, she fights Takanori who confronted her alone before informing her of the misunderstanding that he and Satsuki were rejected by Asahi and Haruto respectively and were comforted each other. Nozomi felt guilt at her mistake and the deeds she had done, as Takanori cured her while apologizing for not acknowledging her and promising to do so now.

A mysterious girl who appears before Subaru members and seems to know about Asahi's appearance in Re'Union. Elicia is later revealed to be the seventh member of Subaru, in episode 12, which also discusses why there are Seven Stars on Pleiades.

Media

Light novels
The light novel series is written by Noritake Tao and illustrated by Booota. It is being published by Shogakukan under their Gagaga Bunko imprint. The first volume was published on August 18, 2015. As of September 19, 2018, eight volumes have been released.

Anime
An anime television series adaptation by Lerche aired from July 6 to September 21, 2018, on TBS. The anime is directed by Yoshihito Nishōji, with Takao Yoshioka in charge of series composition and Yumiko Yamamoto as the character designer. The series ran for 12 episodes.

Reception

Previews
The anime adaptation's first episode garnered mixed reviews from Anime News Network's staff during the Summer 2018 season previews. Theron Martin praised the execution of the story's familiar gimmick being "handled convincingly" and the overall artwork and animation being "above par" and "above-average" respectively. Paul Jensen was critical of the slow pacing due to the over-explanation of its in-game mechanics but was optimistic of the plot getting better after Asahi's death with a focus on serious topics and character development amongst its cast. Rebecca Silverman commended the tonal whiplashes of the story's "light and dark elements" to show that the characters are playing a fun game but did found it "off-kilter" towards the end as it sets up its overarching plot, concluding with: "I like the designs and the use of color in the art and animation, and the plot is intriguing enough that I'll be giving this a few more episodes to see where it goes." James Beckett felt the cast didn't leave much of an impression to care about them and the Union game itself "coming off as a poor-man's SAO" but was interested in "the core mystery of Asahi's reappearance", saying that: "[I]nciting a modicum of curiosity is a low bar for a premiere to pass, but given how subdued this summer season has felt so far, I'll take what I can get." Nick Creamer was initially unimpressed by the first half's basic illustration of the team's relationships and the battle scenes lacking in excitement but got hooked by the second half's world-building, compelling twist and the "reasonably sharp" production quality being upscaled in the character art and dramatic sequences, concluding that: "If Seven Senses premise falls within your wheelhouse, I'd definitely give it a shot."

Series reception
Martin reviewed the complete anime series and gave it a C+ grade. He commended it for attempting to merge the premises of Anohana and .hack//Sign together for their central mystery and give the cast some relationship problems that culminate in "some respectable drama and [allows for some] good character moments" but criticized the needless inclusion of an unfinished secondary storyline to ramp up tension and the "underwhelming action scenes" not living up to the overall production, concluding that: "Overall, Seven Senses of the Re'Union is a decent series that might have been better if it had kept a narrower focus [...] At least this series does bring its most immediate plot thread to a satisfactory resolution." Allen Moody of THEM Anime Reviews criticized the series for blatantly ripping off Anohanas character archetypes and giving them "insufferable jerkishness (Takanori)" or "cliched personalities (Haruto and Nozomi)", concluding that: "I gather that the series here is the bare opening to a longer saga. But, given that Satsuki is the only person I had much positive feeling toward at all, even if another season appears, I do not expect to visit THIS game’s world again."

Notes

References

External links
 
 

2015 Japanese novels
Anime and manga based on light novels
Fantasy anime and manga
Gagaga Bunko
Lerche (studio)
Light novels
TBS Television (Japan) original programming
Sentai Filmworks